Events from the year 1990 in North Korea.

Incumbents
Premier: Yon Hyong-muk 
Supreme Leader: Kim Il-sung

Events
1990 North Korean parliamentary election

Births

 4 January - Ri Chang-ho.
 20 May - Ju Kwang-min.
 22 May - An Byong-jun.
 8 June - Sol Kyong.

References

 
North Korea
1990s in North Korea
Years of the 20th century in North Korea
North Korea